KNWA-TV (channel 51) is a television station licensed to Rogers, Arkansas, United States, serving as the NBC affiliate for Northwest Arkansas and the Arkansas River Valley. It is owned by Nexstar Media Group alongside Fort Smith–licensed Fox affiliate KFTA-TV (channel 24) and Eureka Springs–licensed MyNetworkTV affiliate KXNW (channel 34). The stations share studios on Dickson Street in downtown Fayetteville, with a satellite studio in Rogers and a news bureau and sales office on Kelley Highway in Fort Smith. KNWA-TV's transmitter is located southeast of Garfield, Arkansas.

History
The station began on October 1, 1989 as KFAA, a satellite of KPOM-TV in Fort Smith. Both stations were owned by Oklahoma City-based Griffin Television. Its sign-on marked the first time that NBC had been seen over-the-air in much of the northern part of the market since KFSM-TV (channel 5) lost the area's NBC affiliation to KPOM in 1983. KPOM only provided Grade B coverage of Fayetteville and could not be seen at all in Rogers and points north. In the early 2000s, KPOM and KFAA began a regional local newscast targeting the Fort Smith and Fayetteville areas, Arkansas NBC News. The newscast was anchored by Don Elkins, Rhonda Justice and Donna Bragg, weather by Steve Gibbs and Rick Katzfey, and sports with Mike Nail. Justice, Bragg, Gibbs, and Nail were all formerly of rival station KHBS (channel 40). The newscast was unable to break into the market successfully however and in 2004, Griffin Television sold KPOM-TV and KFAA to Nexstar. The stations changed their calls to KNWA-TV and KFTA-TV respectively on August 13, 2004, and KNWA became the main station. At the same time, the two stations' operations both were merged in a new studio located in the historic Campbell-Bell building on South Block Avenue in Downtown Fayetteville. KFTA's original studio on Kelley Highway in Fort Smith remained in use as KNWA's Arkansas River Valley bureau.

In April 2006, Nexstar announced that it would sell KFTA to Mission Broadcasting, though it would continue to operate the station under a local marketing agreement with KNWA. Under the plan, KFTA would become the Fox affiliate for the area leaving KNWA as the sole NBC affiliate for Northwest Arkansas. Equity Broadcasting, owner of the Class A Fox-affiliate KPBI-CA, challenged the sale of KFTA to Mission with the Federal Communications Commission (FCC). Nonetheless, the separation occurred on August 28 while both were under Nexstar ownership. Until the sale of KFTA to Mission was approved, the stations continued to simulcast from 7 a.m. to 5 p.m. on weekdays. KFTA now runs a separate programming schedule from KNWA, even though Nexstar still owns both KNWA and KFTA outright. This station took its analog transmitter off-the-air for a few days in mid-August to relocate it to another site for improved coverage.

This did not pose as much of a problem as it may have seemed, given the high penetration of cable and satellite service in this area. During the analog era, KFSM and Arkansas PBS satellite KAFT were the only stations that decently covered the market with a single transmitter. Cable and satellite are all but essential for acceptable television in Northwest Arkansas due to its rugged terrain. For example, Dish Network and DirecTV carried KPBI-CA while it was the Fox affiliate even though those carriers usually do not offer low-power stations. After the split, KPBI-CA was dropped in favor of KFTA. On the other hand, the split improved Fox's coverage and enables high definition Fox programming in this market as KPBI-CA is low-power and does not have a digital transmitter, unlike KNWA and KFTA. According to their FCC filings, both stations have digital transmitters licensed for one million watts each, equivalent to five million watts for an analog UHF transmitter. Thus, their digital coverage areas well exceed the analog coverage areas of both KFTA (2.5 million watts) and especially KNWA.

On December 3, 2018, Nexstar announced it would acquire Chicago-based Tribune Media—which has owned CBS affiliate KFSM-TV and MyNetworkTV affiliate KXNW (channel 34) since December 2013—in an all-cash deal valued at $6.4 billion, including the assumption of Tribune-held outstanding debt. Because KNWA and KFSM both rank among the four highest-rated stations in the Fort Smith–Fayetteville market in total day viewership, and broadcasters are not currently allowed to legally own more than two full-power television stations in a single market, Nexstar may be required to sell either KNWA/KFTA or KFSM/KXNW to another broadcasting company in order to comply with FCC ownership rules and alleviate potential antitrust issues preceding approval of the acquisition. On March 20, 2019, it was announced that Nexstar would keep the KNWA/KFTA duopoly (through an existing satellite station waiver that predated KFTA's conversion into a separately programmed Fox affiliate in 2006) and sell KFSM to McLean, Virginia-based Tegna Inc., as part of the company's sale of nineteen Nexstar- and Tribune-operated stations to Tegna and the E. W. Scripps Company in separate deals worth $1.32 billion. KXNW was not named in the sale, which would effectively result in the formation of a de facto triopoly between KFTA and KNWA. The deal—which would make Nexstar the largest television station operator by total number of stations upon its expected closure late in the third quarter of 2019, pending regulatory approval by the FCC and the U.S. Department of Justice's Antitrust Division—would make the KNWA/KFTA duopoly sister stations to Tribune's Oklahoma City duopoly of NBC affiliate KFOR-TV and independent station KAUT-TV (which, in turn, would result in Nexstar owning stations in every market serving portions of the state of Oklahoma, except for the Tulsa and Ada–Sherman markets). The sale was approved by the FCC on September 16 and was completed on September 19, 2019.

Subchannel history

KNWA-DT2

As the latter's transmitter is located in unincorporated northeastern Crawford County (south of Artist Point) and therefore is too far south to adequately cover the northern half of the Fort Smith–Fayetteville DMA partly to the market's large geographical size, KNWA carries a simulcast of Fox-affiliated sister station KFTA-TV on 51.2 – transmitting in 720p high definition – alongside its main signal, in order to relay channel 24's programming throughout the entire market.

KNWA-DT3
KNWA-DT3 is the Laff-affiliated third digital subchannel of KFTA-TV, broadcasting in standard definition on channel 51.3.

On June 15, 2016, Nexstar Broadcasting Group announced that it had entered into an agreement with Katz Broadcasting to affiliate 81 stations owned and/or operated by the group — including KNWA-TV and KFTA-TV — with one or more of Katz's four digital multicast networks, Escape (now Ion Mystery), Laff, Grit and Bounce TV (the latter of which is owned by Bounce Media LLC, whose COO Jonathan Katz serves as president/CEO of Katz Broadcasting). As part of the agreement, KNWA-TV first launched a digital subchannel on virtual channel 51.3 on September 1 of that year to serve as an affiliate of Laff.

KNWA-DT4
KNWA-DT4 is the Grit-affiliated fourth digital subchannel of KNWA-TV, broadcasting in standard definition on channel 51.4. As part of the agreement reached between Nexstar Broadcasting Group and Katz Broadcasting in June 2016, on September 1 of that year, KNWA launched a digital subchannel on virtual channel 51.4 to serve as an affiliate of Grit. (The Escape and Bounce TV affiliation rights for the Fort Smith–Fayetteville market were given to sister station KFTA, which launched subchannels over virtual channels 24.3 and 24.4 to carry those networks on that same date.)

Programming
KNWA-TV currently broadcasts the entire NBC schedule; unlike most of Nexstar's legacy NBC affiliates, the station clears most of NBC's weekend overnight lifestyle lineup and its weekday overnight lineup (consisting of a rebroadcast of the fourth hour of Today and the customary loop of the network's early morning newscast Early Today). Syndicated programs broadcast by KNWA include Entertainment Tonight, The People's Court, Right This Minute and Judge Judy.

The station also produces the news/talk/lifestyle program Good Day NWA, which airs weekdays at 11:00 a.m.; the half-hour program, which debuted on April 23, 2018, is currently hosted by Jason Suel  (who also hosts the lifestyle/variety program Later With Jason Suel, which airs on KFTA following the Saturday edition of its 9:00 p.m. newscast) and Jaclyn House (who also serves as entertainment correspondent for KNWA Today and KFTA's weekday morning newscast Fox 24 News at 7:00).

News operation
, KNWA-TV presently broadcasts 19½ hours of locally produced newscasts each week (with 3½ hours each weekday and one hour each on Saturdays and Sundays). Unlike most NBC-affiliated stations in the Central Time Zone, it does not produce a midday newscast of its own; instead KNWA airs the statewide news program Arkansas Today (which is simulcast on other Nexstar-owned or -managed stations serving Arkansas and border markets including portions of northern Louisiana).

In addition, KNWA produces 13½ hours of locally produced newscasts each week for Fox-affiliated sister station KFTA (with 3½ hours each weekday and a half-hour each on Saturdays and Sundays). KNWA may also simulcast long-form severe weather coverage on KFTA-TV in the event that a tornado warning is issued for any county in its viewing area within northwest Arkansas and east-central Oklahoma.

News department history
KPOM and KFAA relaunched a local newscast in 1999. An earlier local broadcast had aired under various titles until 1992. In 2003 after Morris Multimedia sold KARK in Little Rock to Nexstar, the company eventually consolidated most sports operations from that station with KNWA. The two NBC affiliates share certain news resources with some reports filed by KARK personnel occasionally used during KNWA broadcasts. In 2007, the two stations began co-produced a daily newscast at Noon Monday through Friday, Arkansas at Noon, with news anchors in Little Rock and Fayetteville. Eventually, KARK began airing its own broadcast at that time. Since then, this station has not aired a midday newscast. KFTA maintains a bureau at its original studios on Kelley Highway in Fort Smith.

On April 2, 2012, KNWA debuted a half-hour weekday noon newscast titled Arkansas Today, produced by Little Rock sister station KARK-TV (anchor Mallory Hardin and meteorologist/co-host Greg Dee also appear on KARK's weekday morning newscast); the statewide newscast features news stories filed by reporters from all four Nexstar-owned NBC stations serving Arkansas as well as a KNWA-produced sports segment focusing on University of Arkansas athletics, called Razorback Nation. KNWA also provides a weather insert for northwest Arkansas during the broadcast. In addition to airing on KARK and KNWA, the program is also simulcast on KTAL-TV/Shreveport–Texarkana and KTVE/Monroe–El Dorado (the coverage areas of KTVE and KTAL include several counties in southern Arkansas (ten in KTAL's viewing area, fourteen in KTVE's, though both stations primarily serve parts of northern Louisiana and KTAL also serves parts of northeast Texas). On October 24, 2012, KNWA and KFTA started producing its newscast in high definition.

Technical information

Subchannels
The station's digital signal is multiplexed:

Analog-to-digital conversion
KNWA-TV discontinued regular programming on its analog signal, over UHF channel 51, on June 12, 2009, the official date in which full-power television stations in the United States transitioned from analog to digital broadcasts under federal mandate. The station's digital signal remained on its pre-transition UHF channel 50, using PSIP to display the station's virtual channel as its former UHF analog channel 51.

References

Further reading
Deal could mean new Fox affiliate in NWA  (April 21, 2006)
Fort Smith TV Station Plans Begin To Take Shape  (July 11, 2006)
KPBI, KFTA Fight For Fox Network (July 31, 2006)
Fox Network Likely To Switch In Fort Smith (August 7, 2006)
Fox Switch Planned Monday (August 26, 2006)

External links
KNWA/KFTA/KXNW official website

NBC network affiliates
Grit (TV network) affiliates
Laff (TV network) affiliates
NWA-TV
Television channels and stations established in 1989
1989 establishments in Arkansas
Nexstar Media Group